Palpita varii is a moth in the family Crambidae. It was described by Eugene G. Munroe in 1977. It is found in Seram, Indonesia.

References

Moths described in 1977
Palpita
Moths of Indonesia